Fernando Cermeño Sánchez (born November 11, 1980 in Ávila) is a Spanish actor and model. He is known for participating in several telenovelas of Telemundo.

Filmography

Notes

References

External links 
 

21st-century Spanish male actors
1980 births
Living people
Spanish male television actors
Spanish male telenovela actors